Oreophryne rookmaakeri is a species of frog in the family Microhylidae. It is endemic to the island of Flores, Indonesia. The specific name rookmaakeri honours Hendrik Roelof Rookmaaker, a Dutch colonial administrator who was resident on Flores. Common name Flores cross frog has been coined for this species.

Distribution
The type locality is "Rana Mese" in western Flores, although the IUCN Red List of Threatened Species maps it further east on the island.

Description

Habitat and conservation
It lives in bushes and trees. Presumably, it lays its eggs on the ground and the eggs develop directly to froglets, without free-living larval stage.

There is little specific information on threats to this species, but it would probably be suffer from extensive habitat loss. It is not known to occur in any protected area.

References 

rookmaakeri
Endemic fauna of Indonesia
Amphibians of Indonesia
Amphibians described in 1927
Taxa named by Robert Mertens
Taxonomy articles created by Polbot